The Men's Individual Pursuit event at the 2010 South American Games was held on March 18.  The qualification was held on the morning and the finals on the evening.

Medalists

Results

Qualification

Finals

References
Report

Track cycling at the 2010 South American Games
Men's individual pursuit